Zaluki may refer to:

 Załuki, Podlaskie Voivodeship, a village in Poland
 Załuki, Warmian-Masurian Voivodeship, a village in Poland
 Zaluki, Croatia, a village near Matulji, Croatia